The geology of South Georgia and the South Sandwich Islands is part of the largely submerged Scotia Ridge. The island of South Georgia is unusual among oceanic islands for having pre-Cretaceous sedimentary rocks underlying much of the island and a significant portion of felsic igneous rocks. Two-thirds of the island consists of intensely folded flysch, capped with Aptian age fossils, tuff and greywacke in the Cumberland Bay Series. The series includes slate, phyllite, conglomerate, siltstone and sandstone. In the west are basalt flows, pillowed spilite, prehnite and trachyandesite, as well as shale with radiolarite fossils.

Uranium-lead dating of zircon and muscovite grains from the southern Andes and South Georgia (gathered from the peraluminous Darwin granite suite and undersea Tobifera Formation rhyolite) indicates that the rocks formed during the middle Jurassic. The grains were likely remnant from 1.5 billion years ago.

The fragmentation of the Gondwana supercontinent is preserved in an ophiolite in the Rocas Verdes marginal basin—part of the Larsen Harbour complex on South Georgia. As the continent fragmented, oceanic crust formed in the Weddell Sea in the Middle Jurassic. The ridge's Beagle granite suite has complicated uranium-lead data. Feldspar phenocrysts formed in cracks within the Beagle granite pluton, likely related to the tectonism affecting the high-grade metamorphic rocks of the Cordillera Darwin in Tierra del Fuego.

References